Centrebus Group, is a public transport company based in Leicester with bus services in the Midlands, North West and South East of England.

Owned by Julian Peddle, the group contains Chaserider, Centrebus, High Peak Buses and D&G Bus.

History
Centrebus was founded in 2001 as Anstey Buslines. In 2002, they merged with the businesses of inMotion and Lutonian to form Centrebus.

In January 2004, Centrebus acquired the St Albans operation of Blazefield although in March 2008 it was sold to Uno.

In May 2008 Centrebus entered into a partnership with Arriva Bus UK to form Centrebus Holdings to allow the Huddersfield operations of Stagecoach Yorkshire to be purchased. Despite the common name and livery, Centrebus Holdings has never been owned by Centrebus.

In August 2008, Arriva Midlands' depot in Hinckley was transferred to Centrebus Holdings. In September 2008, Centrebus purchased the bus operations of Woods Coaches in Leicester.

In 2013, Arriva purchased Centrebus' share of Centrebus Holdings and Hinckley operations, rebranding the Huddersfield operations as Yorkshire Tiger and the Hinckley operations as Hinckley Bus. This received approval from regulators in May 2014.

Subsidiaries and interests

High Peak Buses

Centrebus purchased Bowers Coaches in 2007, High Peak Buses was formed in April 2012 by Centrebus and Wellglade Group owned Trent Barton entering a 50/50 joint venture. This saw the Bowers coaches and Trent Barton's Buxton area services combined to form, based at the latter's Dove Holes depot.

D&G Bus

D&G Bus is a bus operator serving the West Midlands and North West formed by David Reeves and Gerald Henderson in April 1998 initially operating four buses on two routes under contract to Stoke-on-Trent City Council. It expanded with both route and school services in Cheshire and Staffordshire with 16 buses by the end of 1998. In April 2005 D&G Bus purchased Wednesfield based Midland, which was sold to Arriva Midlands in 2012. In 2006 following Gerald Henderson's sudden death Julian Peddle purchased Henderson's shareholding in the business.

In December 2019, Julian Peddle's Centrebus Group purchased David Reeves shareholding in D&G bus, at present it will continue to operate as a separate unit from Centrebus.

Chaserider

During November 2020, Centrebus Group subsidary D&G Bus announced they would be taking over the Cannock depot of Arriva Midlands from the end of January 2021 with operations in Cannock and Stafford running under the revived Chaserider brand.

References

External links
Centrebus
Centrebus Group photograph gallery

Bus operators in Derbyshire
Bus operators in Greater Manchester
Bus operators in Leicestershire
Bus operators in Nottinghamshire
Bus operators in Staffordshire
Companies based in Leicestershire